Yeshiva Chofetz Chaim (also known as the Rabbinical Seminary of America) is an Orthodox yeshiva based in Kew Gardens Hills, Queens, New York, United States. It is primarily an American, non-chasidic ultra-orthodox Talmudic yeshiva. The yeshiva is legally titled Rabbinical Seminary of America (RSA) but is often referred to as just Chofetz Chaim as that was the nickname of its namesake, Yisroel Meir Kagan. It has affiliate branches in Israel and North America.

History
The Yeshiva was established in 1933 by Rabbi Dovid Leibowitz, a great-nephew of the Chofetz Chaim. Leibowitz was a disciple of Nosson Tzvi Finkel and he also studied under Naftoli Trop at the Yeshiva in Radun, Belarus.

The yeshiva was named for Leibowitz's great uncle, Rabbi Yisroel Meir Kagan, who had died that year. It is officially named Yeshivas Rabbeinu Yisrael Meir HaKohen, but is often referred to simply as Chofetz Chaim, which is commonly used as a name for Kagan, after his book with the same title. Chofetz Chaim means "Seeker/Desirer [of] Life" in Hebrew.

The Yeshiva's first building was in Williamsburg, Brooklyn. In December 1955 it relocated to Forest Hills, Queens. Most recently, at the start of the 2003 academic year the Yeshiva relocated to Kew Gardens Hills, Queens.

After Leibowitz died in December 1941, he was succeeded as head by his son, Henoch Leibowitz, a role held in the 21st century by Dovid Harris and Akiva Grunblatt.

The yeshiva houses a boys secondary school or Mesivta, an undergraduate ashiva, and a rabbinical school that grants Semicha (ordination). Rabbinical students at the yeshiva often spend a decade or more there, studying a traditional yeshiva curriculum focusing on Talmud, mussar ("ethics"), and halakha ("Jewish law").

Characteristics 

There are six primary characteristics of Yeshivas Chofetz Chaim of Queens that distinguish it from other Yeshivos:

An emphasis upon unfolding the latent processes of reasoning within the steps of the Talmudic sugya ("section") being studied. The methodology places emphasis on the notion that the initial assumptions of the Talmud must be highly rigorous, and that the movement between the initial thought process (known as the hava aminah) of the Talmudic sugya to the final thought process (known as the maskana) must be fully unfolded and understood.
An approach to ethical and Biblical texts and its commentaries that emphasizes rigor. The yeshiva promotes the idea that ideally, a deduction from these texts should be "logically and textually compelling."
The study of Mussar ("ethics"), both by attending and reviewing semiweekly lectures and through daily individual study of Mussar texts, is strongly emphasized.  Dovid Leibowitz founded the Chofetz Chaim yeshiva in the footsteps of his rebbe, the Alter of Slabodka, and Rabbi Yisroel Salanter, the founder of the Mussar movement.   Henoch Leibowitz would continually remind his students that as important as it is to become a lamden ("analytical scholar") and a great pedagogue, it is even more important to become a mentch ("a good human being").
An emphasis on propagating the ideals and values of Judaism. Upon completion of a rigorous term of study, students are encouraged to seek employment, often building Torah institutions like schools and Shuls in communities far away from major Jewish cities like Orlando, FL or Henderson, NV.  Going in the field of Jewish education (Harbatzos Hatorah) is the greatest of goals. Torah is not just ours for us. We need to share it. 
The omni-significance and complete subservience to "Daas Torah" as defined in the introduction to the 6-volume collection of Henoch Lebowitz's mussar lectures, "Chidushei Halev", as well as numerous public ethical discourses. This is the concept that everything is included in the Torah and the way that the Torah logic (i.e. Talmudic reasoning) works is the way that God's mind works; therefore one who has spent years dedicated to in depth Talmudic study has shaped his mind to think like the Torah/God and is thus able to apply the Torah's logic to all manner of situations.
 The Yeshiva Hashkafa (philosophy) is that externals don't matter as much as internals so rather than focusing on looking like a good person it's more important on working on oneself and becoming a good person.

Affiliates and branches by location

United States
 California:
 Valley Torah High School, Los Angeles
Torah High Schools of San Diego, San Diego
Yeshivas Ner Aryeh
Chofetz Chaim of Los Angeles, Los Angeles
Yeshiva Ketana of Los Angeles
Florida:
Yeshiva Toras Chaim Toras Emes, North Miami Beach- Rabbi Binyomin Luban, Rosh Yeshiva
JEC of South Florida, Boca Raton, Florida
Torah Academy of Boca Raton
Yeshiva Tiferes Torah of Boca Raton
Orlando Torah Academy, Orlando, Florida
Illinois:
Torah Academy of Buffalo Grove (day school)
Suburban Alliance for Jewish Education (outreach organization)
Jewish Family Interactive Experience Hebrew School
Kentucky
Montessori Torah Academy, Louisville, KY
Missouri:
 Missouri Torah Institute, St. Louis
New Jersey:
Foxman Torah Institute, Cherry Hill serving the Greater Philadelphia region
Nevada:
Ahavas Torah Center
Las Vegas Kollel
Mesivta of Las Vegas
Yeshiva Day School of Las Vegas
New York:
Huntington
 Yeshiva Zichron Yaakov,  Monsey (closed 2013)
Yeshiva Tiferes Yerushalayim, Brooklyn
Kew Gardens Hills, Queens (main school, described in this article)
Yeshiva Zichron Paltiel, Staten Island
Talmudical Institute of Upstate New York, Rochester
Yeshiva Zichron Aryeh, Bayswater (Far Rockaway)
Mesivta Tiferet Torah, Kew Gardens
Yeshivas Ma'ayan Hatorah, NY, Richmond Hill
Ohio:
Yeshiva of Cleveland, Cleveland Heights, Ohio
Texas:
Texas Torah Institute, Dallas
Wisconsin:
Wisconsin Institute for Torah Study, Milwaukee
Washington:
Torah Academy of the Pacific Northwest, Seattle, Washington

Canada
British Columbia:
Pacific Torah Institute, Vancouver, British Columbia (Moved to Las Vegas, 2019)
Ontario:
Ottawa Torah Institute, Ottawa, Ontario

Israel
 Jerusalem area
Chofetz Chaim Jerusalem-CCJ
Zichron Aryeh Yerushalayim
Ramat Beit Shemesh - Yeshivas Nachalas Yisroel Yitzchok

Notable alumni
 Solomon Sharfman, former rabbi of the Young Israel of Flatbush
 Dovid Harris, co-Rosh Yeshiva (dean) at the Yeshivas Rabbeinu Yisrael Meir HaKohen.
 Akiva Grunblatt, co-Rosh Yeshiva (dean) at the Yeshivas Rabbeinu Yisrael Meir HaKohen.
 Baruch Chait, composer and Rosh Yeshiva of Maarava in Moshav Matisyahu, Israel.
 Elyakim Rosenblatt, Rosh Yeshiva of Yeshiva Kesser Torah
 Binyomin Luban, Rosh Yeshiva of Yeshiva Toras Chaim in Miami

References

External links
Yeshivas Chofetz Chaim Official website

Educational institutions established in 1933
Lithuanian-American culture in New York City
Lithuanian-Jewish culture in New York (state)
Men's universities and colleges in the United States
Chofetz Chaim
Kew Gardens Hills, Queens
1933 establishments in New York City
Jewish seminaries